José David Name Cardozo (born 18 November 1968) is a Colombian senator. He is a member of the Party of the U, and is the son of former Senator José Name Terán. He became a senator in 2006 after serving as consul of Colombia in New York from 1999 to 2005.

Career
Name is of Lebanese descent and belongs to a strong Lebanese community in Colombia's coast. Name studied business administration at the Autonomous University of the Caribbean in Barranquilla. In the Senate, Name was president of the Fifth Commission of Congress. In November 2008, he received death threats after he headed a campaign to restrict the consumption of tobacco in enclosed spaces.

Senate 2014-2018
Name was one of the twelve senators who voted for the TLC with Korea on December 3, 2014.

See also
 Arturo Char Chaljub

References

1968 births
Living people
Jose David
Colombian people of Lebanese descent
People from Barranquilla
Members of the Senate of Colombia
Social Party of National Unity politicians